Vashnam-e Mirgol (also Romanized as Vashnām-e Mīrgol; also known as Vashnām-e Pā’īn, Veshnām, and Voshnām) is a village in Kambel-e Soleyman Rural District, in the Central District of Chabahar County, Sistan and Baluchestan Province, Iran. At the 2006 census, its population was 176, in 34 families.

References 

Populated places in Chabahar County